This is a list of the mammal species recorded in South Sudan. Of the mammal species in South Sudan, three are critically endangered, five are endangered, eleven are vulnerable, and nine are near threatened. One of the species listed for South Sudan can no longer be found in the wild.

The following tags are used to highlight each species' conservation status as assessed by the International Union for Conservation of Nature:

Some species were assessed using an earlier set of criteria. Species assessed using this system have the following instead of near threatened and least concern categories:

Order: Tubulidentata (aardvarks) 

The order Tubulidentata consists of a single species, the aardvark. Tubulidentata are characterised by their teeth which lack a pulp cavity and form thin tubes which are continuously worn down and replaced.

Family: Orycteropodidae
Genus: Orycteropus
 Aardvark, O. afer

Order: Hyracoidea (hyraxes) 

The hyraxes are any of four species of fairly small, thickset, herbivorous mammals in the order Hyracoidea. About the size of a domestic cat they are well-furred, with rounded bodies and a stumpy tail. They are native to Africa and the Middle East.

Family: Procaviidae (hyraxes)
Genus: Heterohyrax
 Yellow-spotted rock hyrax, Heterohyrax brucei LC
Genus: Procavia
 Rock hyrax, Procavia capensis LC

Order: Proboscidea (elephants) 

The elephants comprise three living species and are the largest living land animals.
Family: Elephantidae (elephants)
Genus: Loxodonta
African bush elephant, L. africana 
African forest elephant, L. cyclotis

Order: Primates 

The order Primates contains humans and their closest relatives: lemurs, lorisoids, tarsiers, monkeys, and apes.

Suborder: Strepsirrhini
Infraorder: Lemuriformes
Superfamily: Lorisoidea
Family: Galagidae
Genus: Galago
 Senegal bushbaby, Galago senegalensis LR/lc
Suborder: Haplorhini
Infraorder: Simiiformes
Parvorder: Catarrhini
Superfamily: Cercopithecoidea
Family: Cercopithecidae (Old World monkeys)
Genus: Erythrocebus
 Patas monkey, Erythrocebus patas LR/lc
Genus: Chlorocebus
 Grivet, Chlorocebus aethiops LR/lc
 Tantalus monkey, Chlorocebus tantalus LR/lc
Genus: Papio
 Olive baboon, Papio anubis LR/lc
 Hamadryas baboon, Papio hamadryas LR/nt

Order: Rodentia (rodents) 

Rodents make up the largest order of mammals, with over 40% of mammalian species. They have two incisors in the upper and lower jaw which grow continually and must be kept short by gnawing.

Suborder: Hystricognathi
Family: Bathyergidae
Genus: Cryptomys
 Ochre mole-rat, Cryptomys ochraceocinereus DD
Family: Hystricidae (Old World porcupines)
Genus: Hystrix
 Crested porcupine, Hystrix cristata LC
Suborder: Sciurognathi
Family: Sciuridae (squirrels)
Subfamily: Xerinae
Tribe: Xerini
Genus: Xerus
 Striped ground squirrel, Xerus erythropus LC
 Unstriped ground squirrel, Xerus rutilus LC
Tribe: Protoxerini
Genus: Heliosciurus
 Gambian sun squirrel, Heliosciurus gambianus LC
Family: Gliridae (dormice)
Subfamily: Graphiurinae
Genus: Graphiurus
 Small-eared dormouse, Graphiurus microtis LC
Family: Dipodidae (jerboas)
Subfamily: Dipodinae
Genus: Jaculus
 Lesser Egyptian jerboa, Jaculus jaculus LC
Family: Nesomyidae
Subfamily: Cricetomyinae
Genus: Cricetomys
 Gambian pouched rat, Cricetomys gambianus LC
Family: Cricetidae
Subfamily: Lophiomyinae
Genus: Lophiomys
 Maned rat, Lophiomys imhausi LC
Family: Muridae (mice, rats, voles, gerbils, hamsters, etc.)
Subfamily: Deomyinae
Genus: Acomys
 Cairo spiny mouse, Acomys cahirinus LC
 Gray spiny mouse, Acomys cineraceus LC
Subfamily: Gerbillinae
Genus: Desmodilliscus
 Pouched gerbil, Desmodilliscus braueri LC
Genus: Dipodillus
 North African gerbil, Dipodillus campestris LC
 Mackilligin's gerbil, Dipodillus mackilligini LC
Genus: Gerbillus
 Agag gerbil, Gerbillus agag DD
 Botta's gerbil, Gerbillus bottai DD
 Burton's gerbil, Gerbillus burtoni DD
 Dongola gerbil, Gerbillus dongolanus DD
 Lesser Egyptian gerbil, Gerbillus gerbillus LC
 Pygmy gerbil, Gerbillus henleyi LC
 Lowe's gerbil, Gerbillus lowei DD
 Darfur gerbil, Gerbillus muriculus LC
 Sudan gerbil, Gerbillus nancillus DD
 Principal gerbil, Gerbillus principulus DD
 Greater Egyptian gerbil, Gerbillus pyramidum LC
 Rosalinda gerbil, Gerbillus rosalinda DD
 Khartoum gerbil, Gerbillus stigmonyx DD
 Waters's gerbil, Gerbillus watersi LC
Genus: Meriones
 Sundevall's jird, Meriones crassus LC
Genus: Sekeetamys
 Bushy-tailed jird, Sekeetamys calurus LC
Genus: Tatera
 Kemp's gerbil, Tatera kempi LC
 Fringe-tailed gerbil, Tatera robusta LC
 Savanna gerbil, Tatera valida LC
Genus: Taterillus
 Congo gerbil, Taterillus congicus LC
 Emin's gerbil, Taterillus emini LC
Subfamily: Murinae
Genus: Aethomys
 Hinde's rock rat, Aethomys hindei LC
Genus: Arvicanthis
 African grass rat, Arvicanthis niloticus LC
Genus: Grammomys
 Arid thicket rat, Grammomys aridulus NT
Genus: Lemniscomys
 Heuglin's striped grass mouse, Lemniscomys zebra LC
Genus: Mastomys
 Guinea multimammate mouse, Mastomys erythroleucus LC
 Verheyen's multimammate mouse, Mastomys kollmannspergeri LC
 Natal multimammate mouse, Mastomys natalensis LC
Genus: Myomyscus
 Brockman's rock mouse, Myomyscus brockmani LC
Genus: Praomys
 Dalton's mouse, Praomys daltoni LC
 Jackson's soft-furred mouse, Praomys jacksoni LC
Genus: Zelotomys
 Hildegarde's broad-headed mouse, Zelotomys hildegardeae LC

Order: Lagomorpha (lagomorphs) 

The lagomorphs comprise two families, Leporidae (hares and rabbits), and Ochotonidae (pikas). Though they can resemble rodents, and were classified as a superfamily in that order until the early 20th century, they have since been considered a separate order. They differ from rodents in a number of physical characteristics, such as having four incisors in the upper jaw rather than two.

Family: Leporidae (rabbits, hares)
Genus: Lepus
 Cape hare, Lepus capensis LR/lc
 African savanna hare, Lepus microtis LR/lc

Order: Erinaceomorpha (hedgehogs and gymnures) 

The order Erinaceomorpha contains a single family, Erinaceidae, which comprise the hedgehogs and gymnures. The hedgehogs are easily recognised by their spines while gymnures look more like large rats.

Family: Erinaceidae (hedgehogs)
Subfamily: Erinaceinae
Genus: Atelerix
 Four-toed hedgehog, Atelerix albiventris LR/lc
Genus: Hemiechinus
 Desert hedgehog, Hemiechinus aethiopicus LR/lc

Order: Soricomorpha (shrews, moles, and solenodons) 

The "shrew-forms" are insectivorous mammals. The shrews and solenodons closely resemble mice while the moles are stout-bodied burrowers.

Family: Soricidae (shrews)
Subfamily: Crocidurinae
Genus: Crocidura
 Savanna shrew, Crocidura fulvastra LC
 Bicolored musk shrew, Crocidura fuscomurina LC
 African giant shrew, Crocidura olivieri LC
 Small-footed shrew, Crocidura parvipes LC
 Sahelian tiny shrew, Crocidura pasha LC
 Somali shrew, Crocidura somalica LC
 Savanna path shrew, Crocidura viaria LC
 Voi shrew, Crocidura voi LC
 Yankari shrew, Crocidura yankariensis LC

Order: Chiroptera (bats) 

The bats' most distinguishing feature is that their forelimbs are developed as wings, making them the only mammals capable of flight. Bat species account for about 20% of all mammals.

Family: Pteropodidae (flying foxes, Old World fruit bats)
Subfamily: Pteropodinae
Genus: Eidolon
 Straw-coloured fruit bat, Eidolon helvum LC
Genus: Epomophorus
 Gambian epauletted fruit bat, Epomophorus gambianus LC
 Ethiopian epauletted fruit bat, Epomophorus labiatus LC
Genus: Lissonycteris
 Angolan rousette, Lissonycteris angolensis LC
Genus: Micropteropus
 Peters's dwarf epauletted fruit bat, Micropteropus pusillus LC
Genus: Rousettus
 Egyptian fruit bat, Rousettus aegyptiacus LC
Family: Vespertilionidae
Subfamily: Vespertilioninae
Genus: Eptesicus
 Horn-skinned bat, Eptesicus floweri VU
Genus: Glauconycteris
 Butterfly bat, Glauconycteris variegata LC
Genus: Hypsugo
 Desert pipistrelle, Hypsugo ariel DD
Genus: Neoromicia
 Cape serotine, Neoromicia capensis LC
 Tiny serotine, Neoromicia guineensis LC
 Banana pipistrelle, Neoromicia nanus LC
 Rendall's serotine, Neoromicia rendalli LC
 Somali serotine, Neoromicia somalicus LC
Genus: Nycticeinops
 Schlieffen's bat, Nycticeinops schlieffeni LC
Genus: Pipistrellus
 Egyptian pipistrelle, Pipistrellus deserti LC
 Rüppell's pipistrelle, Pipistrellus rueppelli LC
 Rusty pipistrelle, Pipistrellus rusticus LC
Genus: Scotoecus
 Dark-winged lesser house bat, Scotoecus hirundo DD
Genus: Scotophilus
 African yellow bat, Scotophilus dinganii LC
 White-bellied yellow bat, Scotophilus leucogaster LC
 Greenish yellow bat, Scotophilus viridis LC
Family: Rhinopomatidae
Genus: Rhinopoma
 Egyptian mouse-tailed bat, R. cystops 
 Lesser mouse-tailed bat, Rhinopoma hardwickei LC
 Greater mouse-tailed bat, Rhinopoma microphyllum LC
Family: Molossidae
Genus: Chaerephon
 Ansorge's free-tailed bat, Chaerephon ansorgei LC
 Lappet-eared free-tailed bat, Chaerephon major LC
 Little free-tailed bat, Chaerephon pumila LC
Genus: Mops
 Angolan free-tailed bat, Mops condylurus LC
 Mongalla free-tailed bat, Mops demonstrator NT
 Midas free-tailed bat, Mops midas LC
Family: Emballonuridae
Genus: Coleura
 African sheath-tailed bat, Coleura afra LC
Genus: Taphozous
 Mauritian tomb bat, Taphozous mauritianus LC
 Naked-rumped tomb bat, Taphozous nudiventris LC
 Egyptian tomb bat, Taphozous perforatus LC
Family: Nycteridae
Genus: Nycteris
 Hairy slit-faced bat, Nycteris hispida LC
 Large-eared slit-faced bat, Nycteris macrotis LC
 Egyptian slit-faced bat, Nycteris thebaica LC
Family: Megadermatidae
Genus: Cardioderma
 Heart-nosed bat, Cardioderma cor LC
Genus: Lavia
 Yellow-winged bat, Lavia frons LC
Family: Rhinolophidae
Subfamily: Rhinolophinae
Genus: Rhinolophus
 Geoffroy's horseshoe bat, Rhinolophus clivosus LC
 Rüppell's horseshoe bat, Rhinolophus fumigatus LC
 Lander's horseshoe bat, Rhinolophus landeri LC
Subfamily: Hipposiderinae
Genus: Asellia
 Trident leaf-nosed bat, Asellia tridens LC
Genus: Hipposideros
 Aba roundleaf bat, Hipposideros abae NT
 Sundevall's roundleaf bat, Hipposideros caffer LC
 Noack's roundleaf bat, Hipposideros ruber LC

Order: Pholidota (pangolins) 

The order Pholidota comprises the eight species of pangolin. Pangolins are anteaters and have the powerful claws, elongated snout and long tongue seen in the other unrelated anteater species.

Family: Manidae
Genus: Manis
 Ground pangolin, Manis temminckii LR/nt

Order: Carnivora (carnivorans) 

There are over 260 species of carnivorans, the majority of which feed primarily on meat. They have a characteristic skull shape and dentition.
Suborder: Feliformia
Family: Felidae
Subfamily: Felinae
Genus: Acinonyx
Cheetah, Acinonyx jubatus 
Genus: Caracal
 Caracal, Caracal caracal LC
Genus: Leptailurus
 Serval, Leptailurus serval LC
Subfamily: Pantherinae
Genus: Panthera
Lion, Panthera leo VU
Leopard, Panthera pardus VU
Family: Viverridae
Subfamily: Viverrinae
Genus: Civettictis
 African civet, Civettictis civetta LC
Genus: Genetta
Family: Nandiniidae
Family: Herpestidae (mongooses)
Genus: Atilax
 Marsh mongoose, Atilax paludinosus LC
Genus: Helogale
 Common dwarf mongoose, Helogale parvula LC
Genus: Herpestes
 Egyptian mongoose, Herpestes ichneumon LC
Common slender mongoose, Herpestes sanguineus LC
Genus: Ichneumia
 White-tailed mongoose, Ichneumia albicauda LC
Genus: Mungos
 Banded mongoose, Mungos mungo LC
Family: Hyaenidae (hyaenas)
Genus: Crocuta
 Spotted hyena, Crocuta crocuta LC
Genus: Hyaena
 Striped hyena, Hyaena hyaena NT
Genus: Proteles
 Aardwolf, Proteles cristatus LC
Suborder: Caniformia
Family: Canidae (dogs, foxes)
Genus: Canis
 African golden wolf, Canis lupaster LC
Genus: Lupulella
 Side-striped jackal, L. adusta  
 Black-backed jackal, L. mesomelas  
Genus: Lycaon
 African wild dog, L. pictus EN
Family: Mustelidae (mustelids)
Genus: Ictonyx
 Striped polecat, I. striatus LC
Genus: Mellivora
Honey badger, M. capensis 
Genus: Hydrictis
 Spotted-necked otter, H. maculicollis LC
Genus: Aonyx
 African clawless otter, A. capensis LC

Order: Perissodactyla (odd-toed ungulates) 

The odd-toed ungulates are browsing and grazing mammals. They are usually large to very large, and have relatively simple stomachs and a large middle toe.

Family: Equidae (horses etc.)
Genus: Equus
 Somali wild ass, Equus africanus somaliensis CR
 Grevy's zebra, Equus grevyi EN
 Grant's zebra, Equus quagga boehmi LC
 Maneless zebra, Equus quagga borensis LC
Family: Rhinocerotidae
Genus: Diceros
 Northeastern black rhinoceros, Diceros bicornis brucii EX
 Uganda black rhinoceros, Diceros bicornis ladoensis CR
 Western black rhinoceros, Diceros bicornis longipes EX
 Eastern black rhinoceros, Diceros bicornis michaeli CR
Genus: Ceratotherium
 Northern white rhinoceros, Ceratotherium simum cottoni CR

Order: Artiodactyla (even-toed ungulates) 

The even-toed ungulates are ungulates whose weight is borne about equally by the third and fourth toes, rather than mostly or entirely by the third as in perissodactyls. There are about 220 artiodactyl species, including many that are of great economic importance to humans.

Family: Suidae (pigs)
Subfamily: Phacochoerinae
Genus: Phacochoerus
 Common warthog, Phacochoerus africanus LR/lc
Genus: Potamochoerus
 Bushpig, Potamochoerus larvatus LR/lc
Family: Hippopotamidae (hippopotamuses)
Genus: Hippopotamus
 Hippopotamus, Hippopotamus amphibius VU
Family: Giraffidae (giraffe, okapi)
Genus: Giraffa
 Kordofan giraffe, Giraffa camelopardalis antiquorum VU
 Nubian giraffe, Giraffa camelopardalis camelopardalis EN
 Rothschild's giraffe, Giraffa camelopardalis rothschildi EN
Family: Bovidae (cattle, antelope, sheep, goats)
Subfamily: Alcelaphinae
Genus: Alcelaphus
 Hartebeest, Alcelaphus buselaphus LR/cd
Genus: Damaliscus
 Topi, Damaliscus lunatus LR/cd
Subfamily: Antilopinae
Genus: Gazella
 Dorcas gazelle, Gazella dorcas VU
 Rhim gazelle, Gazella leptoceros EN
 Red-fronted gazelle, Gazella rufifrons VU
 Soemmerring's gazelle, Gazella soemmerringii VU
 Thomson's gazelle, Gazella thomsonii LR/cd
Genus: Madoqua
 Salt's dik-dik, Madoqua saltiana LR/lc
Genus: Oreotragus
 Klipspringer, Oreotragus oreotragus LR/cd
Genus: Ourebia
 Oribi, Ourebia ourebi LR/cd
Subfamily: Bovinae
Genus: Syncerus
 African buffalo, Syncerus caffer LR/cd
Genus: Taurotragus
 Common eland, Taurotragus oryx LR/nt
 Giant eland, Taurotragus derbianus LR/nt
Genus: Tragelaphus
 Bushbuck, Tragelaphus scriptus LR/lc
 Sitatunga, Tragelaphus spekii LR/nt
 Greater kudu, Tragelaphus strepsiceros LR/cd
Subfamily: Caprinae
Genus: Capra
 Nubian ibex, Capra nubiana EN
Subfamily: Cephalophinae
Genus: Cephalophus
 Blue duiker, Cephalophus monticola LR/lc
 Red-flanked duiker, Cephalophus rufilatus LR/cd
 Yellow-backed duiker, Cephalophus silvicultor LR/nt
Genus: Sylvicapra
 Common duiker, Sylvicapra grimmia LR/lc
Subfamily: Hippotraginae
Genus: Oryx
 East African oryx, Oryx beisa beisa NT
Subfamily: Reduncinae
Genus: Kobus
 Waterbuck, Kobus ellipsiprymnus LR/cd
 Kob, Kobus kob LR/cd
 Nile lechwe, Kobus megaceros LR/nt
Genus: Redunca
 Bohor reedbuck, Redunca redunca LR/cd

See also
List of chordate orders
Lists of mammals by region
List of prehistoric mammals
Mammal classification
List of mammals described in the 2000s

Notes

References

South Sudan
South Sudan
Mammals